The Returned is a French supernatural drama television series created by Fabrice Gobert, based on the 2004 French film They Came Back (Les Revenants), directed by Robin Campillo. The series debuted on 26 November 2012 on Canal+ and completed its first season, consisting of eight episodes, on 17 December. In 2013, the first season won an International Emmy for Best Drama Series.

The second season, also comprising eight episodes, premiered on 28 September 2015 on Canal+. It premiered in the UK on 16 October 2015 on More4, and in the US on 31 October 2015 on SundanceTV.

Premise 
In a small French mountain town many dead people reappear apparently alive and normal, including teenage school bus crash victim Camille, suicidal bridegroom Simon, a small boy called "Victor" who was murdered by burglars, and serial killer Serge. While they try to resume their lives, strange phenomena take place: recurring power outages; a mysterious lowering of the local reservoir's water level, revealing the presence of dead animals and a church steeple; and the appearance of strange marks on the bodies of the living and the dead.

Cast and characters

Main characters 
The "Returned"
 Yara Pilartz as Camille Séguret, 15-year-old girl killed in a bus accident four years earlier, and younger Léna
 Swann Nambotin as Victor/Louis Lewanski, 8-year-old boy who died 35 years prior
 Pierre Perrier as Simon Delaître, 23 years old, died the day of his wedding to Adèle a decade earlier
 Guillaume Gouix as Serge Garrel, a serial killer who was killed by his brother Toni seven years earlier
 Ana Girardot as Lucy Clarsen, murdered waitress
 Laetitia de Fombelle as Viviane Costa, 45 years old, wife of Michel Costa, died 34 years earlier
 Ernst Umhauer as Virgil, teenager murdered 35 years ago (season 2)
 Armande Boulanger as Audrey Sabatini, daughter of Sandrine and Yan, classmate of Camille who died in the same bus accident (season 2)
 Thomas Doret as Esteban Koretzky, died in the bus accident (season 2)
 Mélodie Richard as Esther, a young woman killed seven years before (season 2)
 Michaël Abiteboul as Milan Garrel, father of Serge and Toni, who died 35 years earlier (season 2)
 Vladimir Consigny as Morgane, boyfriend/client of Lucy's, died 35 years earlier

Others
 Jenna Thiam as Léna Séguret, Camille's twin sister, now 19 
 Anne Consigny as Claire Séguret, mother of Léna and Camille
 Frédéric Pierrot as Jérôme Séguret, father of Léna and Camille, now separated from Claire
 Jean-François Sivadier as Pierre
 Grégory Gadebois as Toni Garrel, brother of Serge
 Clotilde Hesme as Adèle Werther, Simon's former fiancée
 Brune Martin as Chloé Delaitre, 9, daughter of Adèle Werther and Simon Delaitre
 Céline Sallette as Julie Meyer, a doctor who finds and cares for "Victor"
 Claude Leveque  as Michel Costa, elderly widower of Viviane Costa, who is attended to by Julie Meyer
 Samir Guesmi as Thomas Mézache
 Alix Poisson as Laure Valère
 Constance Dollé as Sandrine Sabatini
 Jérôme Kircher as Father Jean-François
 Laurent Lucas as Berg

Recurring characters 
 Bertrand Constant as Bruno
 Matila Malliarakis as Frédéric
 Guillaume Marquet as Alcide
 Franck Adrien as Yan Sabatini
 Carole Franck as Mademoiselle Payet
 Laurent Capelluto as the army major
 Alice Butaud as Madame Lewanski
 Pauline Parigot as Ophélie
 Nicolas Wanczycki as Lieutenant Janvier
 Aurélien Recoing as Etienne Berg

Episodes

Season 1 (2012)

Season 2 (2015)

Production 
The series was shot in Haute-Savoie, mainly in the city of Annecy, and in Seynod, Menthon-Saint-Bernard, Poisy, Cran-Gevrier, Sévrier, Annecy-le-Vieux, Veyrier-du-Lac, and Semnoz. The dam, which plays an important role, is the Barrage de Tignes. The first season of the series was filmed in April and May 2012. It was directed by Fabrice Gobert and Frédéric Mermoud.

The second season of the series was directed by Fabrice Gobert and Frédéric Goupil. It was originally to be filmed in February and March 2014, for screening from November 2014. However, delays in the writing process pushed filming back until the second half of 2014, and broadcast began in 2015. The synopsis for the second season was released in August 2014, which confirmed there would be a total of eight episodes. Filming for the second season ended on 7 April 2015.

Music 
The series' music was composed by the Scottish post-rock band Mogwai. The band's guitarist John Cummings said in an interview with The Quietus, "They wanted us to start writing it before they started filming it. They described it as inspiring them, they wanted some kind of musical mood in place before they started, so we were working a bit dry at first ... we'd (only) seen the first couple of scripts in English". The band released a four-track sampler of the music (Les Revenants EP) on 17 December 2012, the day of the showing of the final episode. A full-length soundtrack album, Les Revenants, was released on 25 February 2013. In August 2014, it was confirmed that Mogwai would also write the soundtrack for the second season.

Reception 
The series has been critically acclaimed. On Rotten Tomatoes, the first season holds an approval rating of 100% with an average score of 9.2 out of 10 based on 39 reviews and a critics' consensus of, "A pleasant change from typically gory zombie shows, The Returned is a must-see oddity that's both smart and sure to disturb". The second season of the show holds a rating of 95%, with an average score of 9.1 out of 10 based on 20 reviews and a consensus of, "After a long wait, The Returned is back with more of the chilling, deliberate, and masterful storytelling that made season one a spooky success". Le Monde said the series marked a resurgence in the fantasy genre with the dead appearing out of nowhere, trying to regain their lives where they left off. Libération said the series recalled the atmosphere of Twin Peaks by David Lynch. In France, viewing figures averaged 1.4 million over the eight episodes, on Canal+.

For its American showing, the series received a 92 out of 100 rating from Metacritic, which averages critics' reviews, based on 28 reviews. The second season received an 82 out of 100 rating based on 11 reviews.

During a visit to Paris, Stephen King remarked on being a big fan of the show and later tweeted about it.

Accolades 
In 2013, for the 41st International Emmy Award, The Returned won for Best Drama Series. For the 18th Satellite Awards, it received a nomination for Best Television Series or Miniseries, Genre. In 2014, it was awarded with a Peabody Award. It received a nomination for Outstanding Achievement in Movies, Miniseries and Specials for the 2014 TCA Awards. Fabien Adda and Fabrice Gobert received a nomination for Best Screenplay for the episode "The Horde", for the 2013 Bram Stoker Awards.

International broadcasts
Season 1 was broadcast in the United Kingdom from 9 June 2013 on Channel 4. It was the first "fully subtitled drama" on the channel in more than 20 years and was screened in French, with English subtitles. First announced under the English name Rebound, the title was amended to The Returned prior to broadcast. The channel made a feature of the subtitles by broadcasting a specially commissioned advertisement break in French with English subtitles. In the United States, SundanceTV began broadcasting the series' first season on 31 October 2013, before picking up the second season on 11 January 2014. The series began airing in Australia on SBS Two on 11 February 2014. In Canada, the series debuted on 26 April 2014 on Space.

In advance of the second-season premiere, the first two episodes of the season received an advance preview screening at the 2015 Toronto International Film Festival, as part of the festival's new Primetime platform of selected television projects. The second season premiered on 16 October 2015 on More4 in the United Kingdom and on 31 October 2015 in the U.S. on SundanceTV.

International ratings

Season 1

Season 2

Home media release 
The first season was released on DVD in France on 20 December 2012 and in the UK on 9 September 2013. In the United States, the first season was released on both DVD and Blu-ray on 11 February 2014 and the second season on 17 December 2019.

Adaptations 

In May 2013, it was revealed that an English-language adaptation was in development by Paul Abbott and FremantleMedia, with the working title They Came Back. In September 2013, it was revealed that Abbott was no longer involved with the project and that A&E would develop it. In April 2014, A&E ordered 10 episodes with Carlton Cuse and Raelle Tucker as executive producers. The series premiered on 9 March 2015 and was cancelled after one season.

References

External links 
 
 

2010s French drama television series
2012 French television series debuts
2015 French television series endings
French horror fiction television series
French-language television shows
Nonlinear narrative television series
Peabody Award-winning television programs
Serial drama television series
Live action television shows based on films
Television shows set in France
Zombies in television
Canal+ original programming
French supernatural television series